The XIV Grand Prix du Comminges was a Formula One motor race held on 8 August 1948 in Saint-Gaudens, Haute-Garonne, France. Luigi Villoresi, driving a Maserati 4CLT/48, qualified on pole, set fastest lap and won the race by a margin of four and a half minutes. Talbot-Lago drivers "Raph" and Louis Chiron were second and third.

Classification

Race

References

Comminges Grand Prix
Comminges Grand Prix
Comminges Grand Prix